KATK-FM (92.1 FM) is a radio station broadcasting a country music format. Licensed to Carlsbad, New Mexico, United States, the station serves the Carlsbad area.  The station is currently owned by Carlsbad Radio, Inc. and features programming from ABC Radio and Jones Radio Network.

History
The station went on the air as KATK (FM) on June 2, 1980.  On September 22, 1980, the station changed its call sign to KATK, and on January 1, 1987, to the current KATK,

References

External links

ATK-FM